Pedro Santana is a city in the province of Elías Piña in the Dominican Republic. It is located on the border of Haiti.

References 

Populated places in Elías Piña Province
Municipalities of the Dominican Republic